Fredrik Eriksson (born January 30, 1980, in Kristinehamn) is a Swedish professional ice hockey player. He is currently playing for HC Vita Hästen. He has played for Bofors IK in the Allsvenskan, the second highest league in Sweden. He joined Bofors in May 2007, when he left Västerås IK, but he has also played with Bofors IK between 1999 and 2003 and the 2004/05 season. During his time at Bofors he played short stints (sicsic) with Färjestads BK, except the 2003/04 which he was with Färjestas the whole season.

References

1980 births
Bofors IK players
Färjestad BK players
Living people
People from Kristinehamn
Swedish ice hockey goaltenders
Sportspeople from Värmland County